Edie is a  census-designated place located in Lincoln Township, Somerset County in the state of Pennsylvania, United States.  As of the 2010 census, the population was 83.

Demographics

References

Census-designated places in Somerset County, Pennsylvania
Census-designated places in Pennsylvania